"Only With You" is a song recorded by German musician known under the pseudonym of Captain Hollywood Project. It was released in December 1992 as the second single from his debut album, Love Is Not Sex (1993). The single features vocals by German singer Nina Gerhard and was successful on the charts, peaking within the top 10 in at least 12 countries, and reaching number two in both Finland and Portugal. It was released at the end of 1992 and several remixes were also added on a new CD maxi two months after.

Critical reception
Larry Flick from Billboard wrote, "Dance act that scored a recent breakthrough radio and club hit with "More & More" should have little trouble building momentum with this well-structured, totally contagious spinner. Uplifting lyrics are voiced with the Captain's solid rapping and Nina Gerhard singing at the chorus." Dave Sholin from the Gavin Report stated, "Everytime "More & More" hit the air, I couldn't help thinking, "What a great radio record." CHP's follow-up has the same exciting feel." 

Alan Jones from Music Week described it as a "maddeningly commercial, pulsating song [that] alternates between male rap attack and female chorus in all versions". He concluded, "Comparisons with Snap! are obvious, and the end result may be the same - a smash." In 1994, he added that it "also has a haunting quality". James Hamilton from the RM Dance Update deemed it a "girl cooed chesy Euro flutterer". James Hunter from Vibe felt that the song "crosscuts his stairmastered Barry White raps with female choruses, sliding that combo against angular techno riffing and housey programs."

Chart performance
Like "More and More", "Only with You" was successful on the charts in Europe, although it sold under half the amount of its predecessor, reaching the top 5 in Austria (5), Belgium (3), Denmark (3), Finland (2), Germany (4), Portugal (2), Spain (3), Sweden (5) and Switzerland (5). Additionally, the single peaked within the top 10 also in France (7) and the Netherlands (9), as well as on the Eurochart Hot 100, where it reached number six and on MTV's European Top 20. In the UK, it reached its highest position as number 67 in its first week at the UK Singles Chart, on March 21, 1993. On the UK Dance Singles Chart, it fared better, peaking at number 27. Outside Europe, it hit number two on the RPM Dance/Urban chart in Canada and was also successful in Israel, peaking at number six there. 

The single earned a gold record in Germany, with a sale of 250,000 units.

Music video
The accompanying music video for "Only with You" was directed by Walter Knofel. It was later published on YouTube in March 2017, and by December 2022, the video had generated more than 13 million views.

Track listings

 7" single (1992)
 "Only with You" (radio mix) – 3:52
 "Only with You" (dance mix) – 5:34

 CD single (1992)
 "Only with You" (radio mix) – 3:52
 "Only with You" (dance mix) – 5:34

 CD maxi 1 (January 1993)
 "Only with You" (radio mix) – 3:52
 "Only with You" (dance mix) – 5:34
 "Only with You" (house mix) – 6:18
 "Only with You" (trance mix) – 7:17

 CD maxi 2 (March 1993)
 "Only with You" (fantasy remix) – 5:43
 "Only with You" (magic remix) – 6:04
 "Only with You" (faze-2 remix) – 7:20
 "Only with You" (relentless remix) – 7:22

 12" maxi (March 1993)
 "Only with You" – 5:43
 "Only with You" – 6:04
 "Only with You" – 7:20

Charts

Weekly charts

Year-end charts

Certifications

References

1993 singles
1993 songs
Blow Up singles
Captain Hollywood Project songs
English-language German songs
Songs written by Nosie Katzmann
Songs written by Tony Dawson-Harrison